Clubworthy is a hamlet in east Cornwall, England, United Kingdom. It is located six miles (8.5 km) north-northwest of Launceston
.

References

Hamlets in Cornwall